Marie-Louise Caselotti (August 23, 1910July 13, 1999) was an American opera singer.

Biography

Caselotti was born in Bridgeport, Connecticut, the daughter of voice teacher Guido Caselotti, with whom she studied after the family moved to Los Angeles, California.

Caselotti debuted with the San Carlo Opera Company in Los Angeles in 1927 in that city's Philharmonic Auditorium.  She was particularly noted for having sung the title role in Carmen more than four hundred times, and she also appeared notably as Azucena in Il Trovatore.

She performed in Italian motion pictures in the early 1930s. In the United States she sang on radio and even experimental television broadcasts in the 1930s for CBS. She dubbed the voices of several leading Hollywood actresses in the late 1930s and early 1940s. In 1938 she married attorney Edgard Richard "Eddie" Bagarozy (son of Anthony Bagarozy and Maria Conti) and lived in a Riverside Drive apartment in Manhattan. Bagarozy wanted to start his own opera company, but ultimately found the enterprise beyond his abilities. Nevertheless, he planted the seeds for what ultimately became the Lyric Opera of Chicago.

Caselotti and Bagarozy managed the career of a promising Greek-American soprano, Maria Callas, and introduced her to the Metropolitan Opera's general director Edward Johnson.  Caselotti was Callas' vocal coach during 1946 and 1947.

She died July 13, 1999, in Malibu, California, at the age of 88.

Caselotti's younger sister, Adriana, was the voice of Snow White in Walt Disney's 1937 Technicolor animated feature.

References

1910 births
1999 deaths
Musicians from Bridgeport, Connecticut
American mezzo-sopranos
American contraltos
American people of Italian descent
20th-century American women opera singers